Johnny Mitchell Jr. (born January 20, 1971) is a former American football tight end in the National Football League for the New York Jets, Dallas Cowboys and New Orleans Saints. He played college football at the University of Nebraska.

Early years
Mitchell was raised by his grand parents on a 150-acre farm in Tchula, Mississippi, avoiding the difficult neighborhood in Chicago where his parents lived. He moved back to Chicago at age 16, to pursue his education and sports formation.

He graduated from Simeon Career Academy (then known as Simeon Vocational High School) in 1989, where his athletic ability allowed him to play multiple positions including quarterback and defensive end. 

As a sophomore, he was a member of the state championship team. As a senior, he helped his team reach the city finals and received All-state honors.

College career
Although he had initially agreed to attended the University of Miami, after head coach Jimmy Johnson left to coach the Dallas Cowboys of the NFL, he accepted a football scholarship from the University of Nebraska.

Mitchell became the first freshman from Nebraska to make the All-Big Eight first-team since 1946. He was second on the team in receiving, while setting a school record with a 25.6-average per reception and tying the school record for touchdown receptions by a tight end in a season (7). He also set a school bowl record, when he had 5 receptions for 138 yards and one touchdown against Georgia Tech in the 1991 Florida Citrus Bowl.

In 1991, he set school records for tight ends when he had a team-leading 31 receptions for 534 yards and five touchdowns. He also set two school single-game records for receptions and yards by a tight end in the season finale against the University of Oklahoma, when he had 7 catches for 137 yards.

He declared for the NFL Draft after his sophomore season, to help ease the financial burdens of his family. He became the first Nebraska player to leave school for the NFL before his eligibility had expired. He finished his college career with 42 receptions for 816 yards, a 19.4-yard average and 12 touchdowns.

Professional career

New York Jets (first stint)
Mitchell was selected by the New York Jets in the first round (15th overall) of the 1992 NFL Draft, after improving his draft stock through his athletic performance at the NFL Combine, even though he was seen as a raw player. Being a 21-year old rookie, he had difficulty adapting to the professional game and registered only 16 receptions for 210 yards and one touchdown. He suffered a shoulder injury and was placed on the injured reserve list from games 2 through 6.

In 1993, he was among the league's leaders for tight ends with 39 receptions (fourth on the team) for 630 yards (third on the team) and 6 touchdowns. He had 7 receptions for 146 yards and 3 touchdowns against the Philadelphia Eagles. He was declared inactive in 2 games because of a knee injury.

In 1994, his best season came under head coach Pete Carroll, when he was second on the team with 58 receptions for 749 yards and 4 touchdowns. He had 11 receptions for 120 yards against the Minnesota Vikings. He made 5 receptions for 81 yards and 2 touchdowns against the Miami Dolphins.

In 1995, new head coach Rich Kotite took over and selected tight end Kyle Brady with the team's first selection in the 1995 NFL Draft. Mitchell numbers would drop to 45 receptions (third on the team) for 497 yards (second on the team) and 5 touchdowns, after missing 4 games with a back injury. He had 9 receptions for 108 yards and one touchdown against the New England Patriots.

The Jets designated him as their franchise player before the 1996 season and tried to trade him, but ended granting him his release on April 23.

Miami Dolphins
On July 17, 1996, he signed as a free agent with the Miami Dolphins, who at the time were coached by Jimmy Johnson. He walked out of training camp after 12 days and announced his retirement at the age of 25 on July 29.

Dallas Cowboys
On November 21, 1996, the Dallas Cowboys convinced Mitchell to come out of retirement and signed him for depth purposes after dealing with injuries to tight ends Jay Novacek and Eric Bjornson. He played in 4 games (one start), registering one reception for 17 yards. He wasn't re-signed after the season.

New York Jets (second stint)
In 1999, Mitchell asked head coach Bill Parcells for an opportunity to restart his career. He was signed to a free agent contract on January 19, but lasted only one day in training camp, leaving in the middle of the night without telling anyone his intentions. He later announced his retirement on July 31.

New Orleans Saints
On June 4, 2001, he signed with the New Orleans Saints after being out of football for 4 years, who were looking to protect themselves in case Cam Cleeland could not recover from the previous year Achilles' tendon injury. On September 2, he was released after being passed on the depth chart by rookie Boo Williams. On December 26, he was re-signed after Cleeland was placed on the injured reserve list with an Achilles injury. He did not play in the final two games of the season. He was released on August 20, 2002.

Jacksonville Jaguars
On April 14, 2003, he was signed as a free agent by the Jacksonville Jaguars, who were experiencing a contract hold out by tight end Kyle Brady. He was released on August 10.

Personal life
Mitchell was a studio analyst for British television channel Sky Sports on their live NFL coverage, as well on ESPN Brasil and is the head coach for the Coritiba Crocodiles. In the 2013 and 2014 football seasons, he led the Crocodiles to win the National Football Championship in Brasil. He also taught Tee-ball to Kindergarten and Pre-Kindergarten children from the International School of Curitiba.

He now works part-time at Scarisbrick Hall School, teaching young people American football and baseball.

References

External links
Comeback Kid

1971 births
Living people
Players of American football from Chicago
American football tight ends
Nebraska Cornhuskers football players
New York Jets players
Dallas Cowboys players
New Orleans Saints players